The Babysitter is a 1995 American psychological thriller film directed by Guy Ferland and starring Alicia Silverstone, based on the short story of the same name by Robert Coover in his collection Pricksongs and Descants (1969). The film was released direct-to-video in October 1995.

Plot
Jennifer is a beautiful teenager who is hired to babysit the children of Harry Tucker and his wife, Dolly Tucker, while they attend a party hosted by their friends, Bill Holsten and his wife, Bernice Holsten. Harry often fantasizes about Jennifer, while Dolly misinterprets Bill's compliments as a sign of attraction and fantasizes about him. Meanwhile, Jennifer's ex-boyfriend Jack, with whom she broke up when he started pressuring Jennifer for sex, runs into his estranged troublemaking friend Mark, Bill and Bernice's son, who once had a fling with Jennifer and still harbors feelings for her. Throughout the night, Harry, Jack and Mark have increasingly racy fantasies about Jennifer.

Jack calls Jennifer and asks to visit her at the Tuckers' residence, but she refuses. Mark later steals beer from Bill's party, where they run into Harry, who becomes fixated on the notion Jack might go to his house to have sex with Jennifer. Jack and Mark get increasingly drunk and show up uninvited to see Jennifer, but she refuses to let them in. They then spend the rest of the night stalking around the house and spying on her through the window. Meanwhile, Harry gets drunk and falls asleep in his car, where he has a nightmare of Jennifer and Jack having sex, which drives him to rush home and confront them. In his absence, Dolly makes a pass at Bill, who rejects her, but agrees to keep her secret and offers to drive her home.

At the Tuckers' residence, Jack and Mark force their way in while Jennifer is taking a bath and, after a tense argument, Mark knocks Jack unconscious and attempts to rape Jennifer, who runs out of the house. Mark pursues her and ends up being fatally run over by Harry, who is arrested for drunk driving just as Bill and Dolly arrive and hear about the accident. Before being escorted home, Jennifer confronts Jack, who is being questioned by the police, and asks him, "What were you thinking?" before leaving an ashamed and guilt-stricken Jack behind.

Cast
 Alicia Silverstone as Jennifer
 Jeremy London as Jack
 Nicky Katt as Mark Holsten
 J. T. Walsh as Harry Tucker
 Lee Garlington as Dolly Tucker
 Lois Chiles as Bernice Holsten
 George Segal as Bill Holsten
 Ryan Slater as Jimmy
 Brittany English Stephens as Bitsy
 Tuesday Knight as Waitress

Reception
The Babysitter received negative reviews. On Rotten Tomatoes it has an approval rating of 17% based on reviews from 6 critics.  Leonard Maltin gave the film two stars.

References

External links
 
 

1995 films
1995 direct-to-video films
1995 directorial debut films
1995 independent films
1995 thriller films
1990s erotic thriller films
1990s teen drama films
American erotic thriller films
American independent films
American teen drama films
Fiction about child care occupations
Direct-to-video erotic thriller films
1990s English-language films
Films directed by Guy Ferland
Films scored by Loek Dikker
Spelling Films films
Teen thriller films
1990s American films